Percy Coombe (7 January 1880 – 28 July 1947) was an Australian cricketer. He played eight first-class matches for South Australia between 1903 and 1915.

See also
 List of South Australian representative cricketers

References

External links
 

1880 births
1947 deaths
Australian cricketers
South Australia cricketers
Cricketers from Adelaide